George Follmer (born January 27, 1934) is an American former auto racing driver, and one of the most successful road racers of the 1970s. He was born in Phoenix, Arizona. His family moved to California when he was just an infant.

Career
Follmer began his career running a Volkswagen Beetle in Gymkhana competition in parking lots in the San Gabriel Valley of Southern California.

Follmer raced in the USAC Championship Car series in the 1967-1971 and 1974 seasons, with 25 career starts, including the 1969-1971 Indianapolis 500 races.  He finished in the top ten 11 times, with his one victory in 1969 at Phoenix International Raceway. His best finish at the Indianapolis 500 was in 1971. He started 29th and finished in the 15th position driving the Grant King Racer's turbo Offy.

In 1973, Follmer competed in Formula One with Don Nichols' UOP Shadow team. He took part in his first Grand Prix, in South Africa, at the age of 39 years and 1 month - making him F1's oldest débutant since the 1950s, a distinction he still holds. In 13 Championship races, his best results were 6th in South Africa and a podium 3rd in Spain, in his first two Grands Prix, which gave him 13th in the Drivers' Championship with five points. He also competed in several non-Championship races.

Follmer also had success in other racing series.  In 1965, he won the SCCA United States Road Racing Championship. Follmer won two races in the 1970 SCCA Continental Championship for Formula A cars, placing sixth in the standings. He won the Trans-Am championship in 1972, winning four races with an AMC Javelin, and 1976, driving a Porsche 934 Turbo.

In 1972, Follmer was the Can-Am champion, substituting for the injured Mark Donohue in Penske Racing's Porsche 917/10, causing the racing press to dub Follmer "George Am". He was vice-champion in 1973 driving for Rinzler and 1974 in a Shadow. He collected 6 wins and 13 podiums in the three-year spell. He is the only driver to win the Can-Am and Trans-Am championship in the same year.

Follmer competed in the NASCAR Winston Cup series in 1974, with appearances in 13 of 30 races. He collected three top 5 finishes and a pole position. In 1974 and 1975, he raced at the International Race of Champions, where he won a race.

In 1977 he returned to the revived Can-Am, resulting 6th in 1977 and 5th in 1978. He won the 1978 St. Jovite Can Am in his Prophet-Chevy over Alan Jones.

After his retirement, he came back to racing for the 1986 24 Hours of Le Mans, obtaining a prestigious third place with a Porsche 956.

Though long-retired from professional motorsports competition, Follmer still competes in vintage races, often driving the very same cars in which he competed during his heyday.

In addition to his racing career, Follmer also owned a Porsche-Audi-Subaru dealership in Pomona, California, later relocated to Montclair, California, from 1977 to 1990.

Award
He was inducted in the Motorsports Hall of Fame of America in 1999.  He was also inducted into the SCCA Hall of Fame in 2019.

2014 Saleen Mustang Limited Edition

On August 17, 2013 Saleen introduced a limited edition Saleen | George Follmer Edition  Ford Mustang. Based on the #16 1969 Boss 302 Mustang racecar that he drove in the 1969 SCCA Trans-Am series, the 2014 Saleen/Follmer Edition was period correct with its livery, naturally aspirated 495HP 5.0L high revving engine, track tuned suspension, and 6-speed manual transmission. Production was limited to 250 units.

Motorsports career results

24 Hours of Le Mans results

American open-wheel racing
(key) (Races in bold indicate pole position)

USAC Championship Car

Indianapolis 500

NASCAR
(key) (Bold – Pole position awarded by qualifying time. Italics – Pole position earned by points standings or practice time. * – Most laps led.)

Winston Cup Series

Daytona 500

International Race of Champions
(key) (Bold – Pole position. * – Most laps led.)

Complete Formula One World Championship results
(key) (Races in bold indicate pole position; races in italics indicate fastest lap)

Non-Championship Formula One results
(key) (races in bold indicate pole position; races in italics indicate fastest lap)
(Races in italics indicate fastest lap)

Complete Canadian-American Challenge Cup results
(key) (Races in bold indicate pole position) (Races in italics indicate fastest lap)

References

Further reading
 Follmer Book.com

External links

Profile at www.grandprix.com
George Follmer at Driver Database
George Follmer at Racing Reference

1934 births
24 Hours of Le Mans drivers
American Formula One drivers
American people of German descent
Shadow Formula One drivers
Indianapolis 500 drivers
International Race of Champions drivers
Living people
NASCAR drivers
Racing drivers from Phoenix, Arizona
Trans-Am Series drivers
World Sportscar Championship drivers
Team Joest drivers
Team Penske drivers